The Siwa culture was a Bronze Age culture in southeast Gansu Province, China. It was discovered by Swedish geologist Johan Gunnar Andersson in 1924 at Mount Siwa in Lintao County, hence its name. It flourished circa 14th to 11th century BC, it is tentatively attributed to the cultures of the Northern Di, Qiang, and Xunyu peoples.

The archaeological culture is divided into two phases: the early phase associated with the sites at Lintao, Zhuoni, Lintan, and Heshui; and, the final phase during the late Shang and proto-Zhou periods associated with the Jiuzhan, Xujianian, and Lanquiao sites. Siwa culture is known for producing a type of pottery that had saddle-shaped mouths.

Context
The neighbouring Xindian culture was roughly contemporary with the Siwa culture, and was influenced by it.  Some scholars hold that Siwa culture descended from the Qijia culture. There are also those who believe that the culture was a remnant of Xunyu, which is associated with the Xianyun people. However, questions are raised against this theory since Siwa sites are small with low subsistence levels. According to archaeologists, these could not have sustained an advanced society like the Xianyun.

Geography
Siwa culture is divided into two types – Siwa and Anguo. The former is distributed along the Tao River (Taohe) and the latter along the Wei River. The Siwa type is somewhat earlier than the Western Zhou dynasty, while the Anguo type is more or less contemporaneous with it.

One of Siwa culture's main characteristics is pottery with saddle-shaped openings, It is also distinguished by its bronze objects.

Since 2006, the Siwa site is on the list of the People's Republic of China's archeological monuments.

References

Further reading 
Nicola Di Cosmo (1999), The Northern Frontier in Pre-Imperial China//The Cambridge History of Ancient China: From the Origins of Civilization to 221 BC, Edited by M.Loewe and E.L.Shaughnessy. 

Archaeological cultures of China
Bronze Age in China
History of Gansu
1924 in China
Zhou dynasty
14th-century BC establishments